Victoria Mercanton, or Victoria Spiri-Mercanton (1911–2007), was a French film editor and director, born Victoria Aleksandr Pozner on January 25, 1911, in Saint Petersburg, Russia, active from the 1930s to 1970s.

Family 
Daughter of Russian Jews Aleksandr and Elizaveta Pozner. Her family fled Soviet Russia after the Bolshevik Revolution.

Husband —  film editor Roger Spiri-Mercanton 
 Brother — Vladimir Aleksandrovich Pozner
 Nephew — Vladimir Pozner

References

External links

 BFI

1911 births
2007 deaths
French film editors
French women film editors
French people of Russian-Jewish descent
Soviet emigrants to France
Russian Jews